William J. Renick (born June 16, 1953) is an American politician.

Renick was born on June 16, 1953, to Jack and Lillie Jean Renick. He graduated from Frayser High School in Memphis, Tennessee. At the age of 18, he became one of the youngest elected officials in the history of Mississippi when he was elected an alderman for the city of Ashland. At the age of 27, Renick became one of Mississippi's youngest mayors. He was later elected a Benton County Supervisor, where he helped to start the Benton County Medical Center.

From 1988 to 1992, Renick served as a member of the Mississippi State Senate representing Marshall, Benton and Tippah Counties in north Mississippi. In 1989, Renick was targeted in a lawsuit by the Mississippi Attorney General's office as well as the state Ethics Commission. In the lawsuit, Renick was charged with using his position as Benton County supervisor to benefit his own trucking company; the suit was dismissed. When his Senate colleague, Eddie Briggs (R) was elected Lt. Governor of Mississippi, Renick became his chief of staff. In 2002, another former State Senate colleague, Governor Ronnie Musgrove (D), hired Renick as Chief of Staff to the Governor. He campaigned  for Governor of Mississippi as a Democrat before withdrawing on April 23, 2007.

Notes

1953 births
County supervisors in Mississippi
Living people
Mississippi state senators
Mayors of places in Mississippi
People from Ashland, Mississippi